The 1816 Rhode Island gubernatorial election was held on April 17, 1816.

Incumbent Federalist Governor William Jones won re-election to a sixth term, defeating Democratic-Republican nominee Nehemiah R. Knight.

General election

Candidates
Nehemiah R. Knight, Democratic-Republican, clerk of the circuit court, collector of customs
William Jones, Federalist, incumbent Governor

Results

County results

References

1816
Rhode Island
Gubernatorial